Hollyrood Grama Niladhari Division is a  Grama Niladhari Division of the  Nuwara Eliya Divisional Secretariat  of Nuwara Eliya District  of Central Province, Sri Lanka .  It has Grama Niladhari Division Code 475S.

Upper Kotmale Dam  are located within, nearby or associated with Hollyrood.

Hollyrood is a surrounded by the  Barewell, Devon, Great Western, Thalawakele and Watagoda  Grama Niladhari Divisions.

Demographics

Ethnicity 

The Hollyrood Grama Niladhari Division has  an Indian Tamil majority (67.7%) and a significant Sinhalese population (27.1%) . In comparison, the Nuwara Eliya Divisional Secretariat (which contains the Hollyrood Grama Niladhari Division) has  an Indian Tamil majority (70.5%) and a significant Sinhalese population (20.0%)

Religion 

The Hollyrood Grama Niladhari Division has  a Hindu majority (57.7%) and a significant Buddhist population (26.6%) . In comparison, the Nuwara Eliya Divisional Secretariat (which contains the Hollyrood Grama Niladhari Division) has  a Hindu majority (67.7%) and a significant Buddhist population (18.7%)

Gallery

References 

Grama Niladhari Divisions of Nuwara Eliya Divisional Secretariat